Haywood is an unincorporated community recognized as a local urban district in the province of Manitoba, Canada. Haywood is situated in the Rural Municipality of Grey, east of St. Claude and west of Elm Creek.

The community includes a church, a hall, a cemetery, and many other public areas and services that most communities provide. Haywood, however, does not have a school, and therefore, students ride the bus to St. Claude, a neighbouring community to the west.

Haywood was founded in 1907. The centennial anniversary was acknowledged in 2007. The event was celebrated by featuring a float parade, sponsored by a number Haywood and St. Claude businesses and families. A supper was later held in the community hall, followed by a show of fireworks, at around 11:00 PM that night.

References

Local urban districts in Manitoba
Populated places established in 1907
Unincorporated communities in Central Plains Region, Manitoba